The Roman Catholic Diocese of Datong/Tatung  is a Latin diocese in the Ecclesiastical province of Taiyuan in PR China.

It has its cathedral episcopal see Cathedral of the Immaculate Heart of Mary in the city of Datong (Shanxi) but is vacant.

History 
 Established on March 14, 1922 as Apostolic Prefecture of Datongfu 大同府, on territory split off from the Apostolic Vicariate of Northern Shansi 山西北境)
 Promoted on June 17, 1932 as Apostolic Vicariate of Datongfu 大同府
 Promoted on April 11, 1946 as Diocese of Datong 大同, ceasing to be exempt and becoming a suffragan.

Ordinaries 
(all Roman Rite; so far all missionary members of the Latin congregation Scheutists, C.I.C.M.)
 Apostolic Prefect of Datongfu 大同府 
 Father Joseph Hoogers, C.I.C.M. (March 3, 1923–1932), previously Ecclesiastical Superior of the Mission sui iuris of I-li 伊犁 (imperial China) (1918.06.08 – 1922)

 Apostolic Vicar of Datongfu 大同府 
 Franciscus Joosten, C.I.C.M. (June 21, 1932 – April 11, 1946 see below), Titular Bishop of Germanicopolis (in Isauria) (1932.06.14 – 1946.04.11)

 Suffragan Bishops of Datong 大同 
 Franciscus Joosten, C.I.C.M. (see above April 11, 1946 – 1947)
 Apostolic Administrator Alphonse Van Buggenhout (范普厚), C.I.C.M. (1950.03.31 – 1951), later Secretary General of the Chinese Regional Bishops’ Conference 1967 – 1970
 Thaddeus Guo Yin-gong (郭印宮) (1990 – 2000?)
 (sede vacante)

References 

 GCatholic.org with incumbent biography links
 Catholic Hierarchy

Source and External links 
 GigaCatholic with incumbent biography links

Roman Catholic dioceses in China
Christian organizations established in 1922
Roman Catholic dioceses and prelatures established in the 20th century
Organizations based in Shanxi
Religion in Shanxi